Roberto Greco is an Italian artist, living and working in Florence.

Early life
Greco was born in Benghazi to Italian parents. In the mid-1960s he began to study painting by attending the classes of well-known masters of the Art School and the Academy of Fine Arts in Florence, including Antonio Bueno and Siro Salimbeni and the School of Nude. He was a student of Osman Lorenzo De Scolari.

Career 
In 1984, he made a mural at the Stadio Artemio Franchi of Firenze and won the first prize at the Biennale di San Giovanni Battista in Florence.

In 1986 he started to exhibit in Italy and Europe and in the contemporary art fairs at Bologna, Padova, Florence and other countries.

In 2018 La Pergola Arte Awarded him with the painter of the year 2018.

Further reading 

 1999 Introart. Raffaello Gori, Roberto Greco, Massimo Podestà Editore: Prato, Lions Club Prato Datini
 2004 “Sipario su l’Essenziale” edited by Franco Manescalchi
 2019 Roberto Greco "Artista del suo tempo" curated by  Peter Michael Musone.

Recognition 

 1976: first prize at the National Contest  “Maestri Fiorentini” 
 1984: first prize at the Biennale di San Giovanni Battista di Firenze

References

External links
 http://archivio.gonews.it/articolo_40187_mostra-Prato-Sinfonie-dipinte-Roberto-Greco.html
 https://www.artingout.com/artisti/greco-roberto/rga01a001/
 http://www.studiolongobellesi.it/studio_associato_di_odontoiatria/Blog/Voci/2010/3/25_mostra_di_pittura_di_Roberto_Greco.html
 http://www.arcadja.com/auctions/it/greco_roberto/prezzi-opere/217288/
 http://ricerca.gelocal.it/iltirreno/archivio/iltirreno/2007/11/24/ZP2PO_ZP205.html
 http://corrierefiorentino.corriere.it/firenze/eventi/232458_scheda.shtml?ageId=12665394&refresh_ce-cp
 http://www.okmugello.it/mugello/arte-sport-a-firenze-info
 https://www.iedm.it/2004/01/15/826/
 http://press.comune.fi.it/hcm/hcm5353-10_5_1-Firenze+Capitale,++a+Villa+Arrivabene+la+mostra+di.html?cm_id_details=71203&id_padre=4473
 http://www.giovannichilleri.com/wp/index.php/biografia/
 http://www.artexpo22.com/portfolio_page/collezionista-privato-a-a/
 25_mostra_di_pittura_di_Roberto_Greco.html

Italian artists
Living people
1936 births